POU domain class 2-associating factor 1 is a protein that in humans is encoded by the POU2AF1 gene. The protein is  also termed Oct coactivator from B cells (i.e. OCAB), Oct binding factor 1 (OBF1 or OBF-1), and, as commonly found in the literature, BOB1. BOB1 is a transcriptional coactivator (i.e. a protein that controls the activity of transcription factors) which is expressed principally by B-cell lymphocytes and controls immunoglobulin and other genes critical for these cells expression of CD20, CRISP-3, and CD36. The expression of BOB1 has proven useful for identifying certain lymphomas as being B-cell lymphomas, as exemplified in studies which use BAB1 expression to help identify lymphomas as being diffuse large B-cell lymphomas, not otherwise specified.

Interactions 

POU2AF1 has been shown to interact with:
 POU2F1  and
 SIAH1.

See also 
 POU domain
 POU domain class 2 transcription factors:
 POU2F1, POU2F2, POU2F3

References

Further reading